Kiraz may refer to:

Places
 Kiraz, Turkey, a district of İzmir Province in Turkey
 Kiraz, Susurluk, a village

 Edmond Kiraz (1923–2020), humor cartoonist and illustrator based in France
 Esra Kiraz (born 1992), Turkish women's armwrestler
 Emrah Kiraz (born 1987), Turkish footballer
 Ferhat Kiraz (born 1989), Turkish footballer
 George Kiraz (born 1965), American Syriacist
 Ümmü Kiraz (born 1982), Turkish female long-distance runner

Turkish-language surnames